Barbara Sołtysik (born 5 August 1942) is a Polish actress. She appeared in more than 35 films and television shows between 1962 and 2006.

Selected filmography
 Potem nastąpi cisza (1965)
 Family Life (1971)

References

External links

1942 births
Living people
Polish film actresses
People from Wadowice
Recipient of the Meritorious Activist of Culture badge